The Kunming Ring Expressway, designated as G5601, is  expressway in Kunming, Yunnan, China.

References

Chinese national-level expressways
Expressways in Yunnan
Transport in Kunming